John Darius Bikoff (born September 21, 1961) is an American entrepreneur, founder and CEO of Energy Brands.

Early life 
He was born to an American father from Brooklyn and an Iranian Jewish mother. His father, William, was the owner of a real estate management company and was also a metals importer.

In 2007, Bikoff sold Energy Brands to The Coca-Cola Company for $4.1 billion. This deal earned Bikoff personally $325 million. The brand is known mostly for the product VitaminWater.

Personal life
J. Darius and Jill Bikoff were married in 2003 and have two children. He owns a four-bedroom, 2 bathroom apartment condo in New York City.

References 

1961 births
Living people
American food company founders
American people of Iranian descent
Colgate University alumni
American chief executives of food industry companies